Mahamandir railway station is a railway station on the North Western Railways network in the state of Rajasthan. Its code is MMC. It serves Jodhpur city. The station consists of two platforms. The platforms are not well sheltered. It lacks many facilities including water and sanitation.  It is located approximately 3 km from Jodhpur railway station.

Important trains

Some of the important trains that run from Mahamandir are:

 Jodhpur–Jaisalmer Passenger 
 Jaisalmer–Jodhpur Passenger

See also

 Jodhpur railway station

References

Railway stations in Jodhpur district
Transport in Jodhpur
Jodhpur railway division
Buildings and structures in Jodhpur